Ke Hobe Biggest Fan was a Bengali talk show which used to air on Zee Bangla. It was hosted by Anurag Basu.

About the show
The show used to present an interactive session between an eminent personality of India and his or her fans. Anurag used to take interviews of the guests and the fans. In this way the show served to bridge the gap between a celebrity and his/her biggest fan.

Invited celebrities
Celebrities from both Tollywood and Bollywood were invited to the show. Some of them are Konkona Sen Sharma, Soha Ali Khan, Jeet, Dev, Koel, Prosenjit Chatterjee, Sourav Ganguly, Srabanti Chatterjee, Bhaichung Bhutia, Bappi Lahiri, Pritam, Shaan, Sukhwinder Singh, Manna De, Manoj Tiwary-Ashok Dinda .

References 

Zee Bangla original programming
Bengali-language television programming in India
Indian television talk shows